Intriptyline is a tricyclic antidepressant (TCA) that was never marketed.

See also 

 Benzocycloheptenes
 Cyclobenzaprine
 Tricyclic antidepressant

References 

Tricyclic antidepressants
Alkyne derivatives
Dibenzocycloheptenes
Abandoned drugs